Silver Creek is a stream in Floyd County and Polk County, Georgia, in the United States.

Silver Creek was so named on account of the silver mining in the area. The stream lends its name to the community of Silver Creek, Georgia.

See also
List of rivers of Georgia (U.S. state)

References

Rivers of Floyd County, Georgia
Rivers of Polk County, Georgia
Rivers of Georgia (U.S. state)